The Diocese of Tiraspol and Dubăsari (Tiraspolskaya i Dubossarskaya yeparkhiya, Tyraspolska i Dubossarska yeparkhiya) is a diocese of the Metropolis of Chișinău and All Moldova which covers the exact territory of Transnistria, Moldova. The newly built (1999) Christmas Church in the region's capital, Tiraspol, is the Mother Church of this diocese.

It is headed by Bishop Savva and supported by the Moscow Patriarchate.

The diocese was established on October 6, 1998, by the Holy Synod of the Russian Orthodox Church to organize the Orthodox Church in the breakaway Pridnestrovian Moldavian Republic.

As of 2010 the diocese consisted of 104 parishes and 2 monasteries served by 104 full-time priests and 14 deacons.

External links 
  Diocese of Tiraspol and Dubăsari official website
  Diocese of Tiraspol and Dubăsari info 
  Russian Orthodox website

Eparchies of the Russian Orthodox Church
Christianity in Transnistria
Eastern Orthodox dioceses in Moldova